The following is the filmography of Vijayakanth, an Indian politician and film actor.

Filmography

Actor

2010s

2000s

1990s

1980s

1970s

As producer
Vijayakanth with his brother-in-law L. K. Sudheesh has produced films under the company Captain Cine Creations.
Vallarasu (2000)
Narasimha (2001)
Thennavan (2003)
Engal Anna (2004)
Sudesi (2006)
Arasangam (2008)
Viruthagiri (2010)
Sagaptham (2015)

References

Indian filmographies
Male actor filmographies